The National Film Award for Best Supporting Actress is an honour presented annually at India's National Film Awards ceremony by the Directorate of Film Festivals (DFF), an organisation set up by the Indian Ministry of Information and Broadcasting. Since 1984, the award is given by a national panel appointed annually by the DFF to an actress for the best performance in a supporting role within Indian cinema. It is presented by the President of India at a ceremony held in New Delhi.

The winner is given a "Rajat Kamal" (Silver Lotus) certificate and a cash prize of 50,000 (US$780). Including ties and repeat winners, the DFF has presented a total of 39 Best Supporting Actress awards to 35 different actresses. Although Indian cinema produces films in more than 20 languages, the performances of films that have won awards are of ten languages: Hindi (18 awards), Malayalam (7 awards), Bengali (4 awards), Tamil (4 awards), English (2 awards), Meitei (1 award), Marathi (1 award), Urdu (1 award), Haryanvi (1 award), Odia (1 award) .

The first recipient was Rohini Hattangadi, who was honoured at the 32nd National Film Awards for her performance in the Hindi film Party (1984). , Surekha Sikri have been honoured thrice for her Hindi films - Tamas (1987), Mammo (1994) and Badhaai Ho (2018). K. P. A. C. Lalitha won the award two times for her work in the Malayalam films Amaram (1990) and Shantham (2000). Egyptian actress Aida El-Kashef, who was honoured at the 61st National Film Awards for her performance in the English-Hindi film Ship of Theseus (2013) is the only non-Indian actress to win the award. Urvashi and Kalpana are the only siblings to receive the honour. Ties between two actresses have occurred in the years 1999, 2012 and 2013. Sharmila Tagore, Konkona Sen Sharma and Kangana Ranaut are the three actresses to receive honours in both acting categories: Best Actress and Best Supporting Actress. The most recent recipient is Lakshmi Priyaa Chandramouli, who was honoured at the 68th National Film Awards for her performance in the Tamil film Sivaranjiniyum Innum Sila Pengalum (2020).

Multiple recipients
3 wins:Surekha Sikri
2 wins:K. P. A. C. Lalitha

Recipients

Key

See also
 List of Indian film actresses

Footnotes

References

External links
 Official Page for Directorate of Film Festivals, India
 National Film Awards Archives

Supporting Actress
Film awards for supporting actress